The North River is a  river in western Massachusetts, the United States.

It is formed by the confluence of the  West Branch and the  East Branch of the North River in the town of Colrain, Massachusetts.  The river is a tributary of the Deerfield River, joining it just north of the village of Shelburne Falls.

See also
List of rivers of Massachusetts

References

Rivers of Franklin County, Massachusetts
Tributaries of the Connecticut River
Rivers of Massachusetts